Digiscoping is a neologism for afocal photography,  using a (digital) camera to record distant images through the eyepiece of an optical telescope.

Digiscoping usually refers to using either a digital single-lens reflex camera with lens attached or, more often, a fixed lens point and shoot digital camera to obtain photos through the eyepiece of a birdwatcher's spotting scope.  The term has also been associated with the use of a digital camera and spotting scope equipped for prime focus photography.

Origins
The portmanteau term "digiscoping" (= digital camera + telescoping) was coined in 1999 by French birdwatcher Alain Fossé. Less notable neologisms for this activity are digiscope birding, digiscopy birding, digi-birding, digibinning (using digital camera with binoculars), and phonescoping (using a digital camera phone with a spotting scope or binoculars).

The origins of the activity called Digiscoping has been attributed to the photographic methods of  Laurence Poh, a birdwatcher from the Malaysian Nature Society, who discovered in 1999 almost by accident that the new generation of point and shoot digital cameras could be held up to the eyepiece of a standard spotting scope and achieve surprisingly good results. He spread his findings through birding internet discussion forums and one member, French birdwatcher Alain Fossé, coined the name  "digiscoping" to describe the technique. Laurence Poh is sometimes credited with "inventing" the technique although his contribution may be more along the lines of popularizing the idea and refining the technology.

Using a camera with its lens attached at the eyepiece of optical devices such as microscopes or telescopes, creating an afocal system (technically called afocal photography or afocal projection) had been used for nearly 100 years and digital camera afocal photography was already being employed in the amateur astronomical community. This form of afocal photography became more common in general photography in the 21st century with the spread of point and shoot digital cameras because of the ease of use of this type of setup. Several companies sell couplers and other devices for mounting digital cameras afocally.

See also
 Wildlife photography

References

Further reading
 "Digital Photography Hacks" by Derrick Story, pages 272-276 "Hack #94 - Get Close with Digiscoping"

External links

 laurencepoh.com, website of the man attributed as the developer of “Digiscoping”
 Website of Alain Fosse who coined the word “digiscoping”
 German website about digiscoping with very inspiring images

Astrophotography
Birdwatching
Ornithological equipment and methods
Photographic techniques
Neologisms
1990s neologisms